Gérald Rollo (born 11 March 1968) is a retired French Paralympic judoka who competed at international judo competitions. He participated at five Paralympic Games and won two Paralympic medals during his sporting career.

References

1968 births
Living people
Sportspeople from Lorient
Paralympic judoka of France
French male judoka
Judoka at the 1992 Summer Paralympics
Judoka at the 1996 Summer Paralympics
Judoka at the 2000 Summer Paralympics
Judoka at the 2004 Summer Paralympics
Judoka at the 2008 Summer Paralympics
Medalists at the 1996 Summer Paralympics
Medalists at the 2000 Summer Paralympics
21st-century French people